Jenny Rautionaho (born 26 July 1996) is a Finnish ski jumper who has competed at World Cup level since the 2019–20 season. Her father is former ski jumper Esko Rautionaho.

Career
Rautionaho's best individual World Cup result is 9th place in Wisła on 5 November 2022. Her best team World Cup result is 6th place in Oslo on 4 March 2022. In the Continental Cup, her best individual result is fourth place in Oslo (twice) on 18–19 September 2021. At the 2023 Nordic World Ski Championships, she achieved sixth place representing Finland in the mixed team normal hill competition.

References

1996 births
Living people
Finnish female ski jumpers
21st-century Finnish women
Sportspeople from Lapland (Finland)
People from Rovaniemi